Houstonia subviscosa, the nodding bluet, is a plant species in the Rubiaceae. It is native to Texas.

References

External links
Lady Bird Johnson Wildflower Center, University of Texas at Austin
Digital Flora, University of Texas
Gardening Europe

subviscosa
Endemic flora of Texas
Plants described in 1853
Taxa named by Asa Gray
Flora without expected TNC conservation status